Bang Seung-hun (born 15 December 1975) is a South Korean freestyle swimmer. He competed in two events at the 1992 Summer Olympics.

References

External links
 

1975 births
Living people
South Korean male freestyle swimmers
Olympic swimmers of South Korea
Swimmers at the 1992 Summer Olympics
Place of birth missing (living people)
Asian Games medalists in swimming
Swimmers at the 1994 Asian Games
Asian Games gold medalists for South Korea
Asian Games silver medalists for South Korea
Medalists at the 1994 Asian Games
20th-century South Korean people